Benjamin Reichert (born 17 May 1983 in Essen, North Rhine-Westphalia) is a German former professional football player and co-founder of the SK Gaming e-sports clan.

Reichert started his career in the junior teams of Rot-Weiß Oberhausen. His first call-up to the men's squad came in the 2002–03 season, where he was subbed into a game of RWO in the 2. Bundesliga. When Oberhausen was relegated into the Regionalliga and even into the Oberliga (third and fourth German soccer divisions), Reichert stuck with his team. He became a regular on the teams that were promoted into the Regionalliga in 2007–08 and into the 2. Bundesliga one year later.

Reichert is also notable as an e-sports pioneer. In 1997, he founded the clan SK Gaming (named "Schroet Kommando" back then) with his brothers Ralf and Tim Reichert and several other gamers, among them Musa Celik. Among gamers, Reichert was known as SK|Kane. Remarkably, both Tim SK|Burke Reichert and Musa SK|kila Celik also played professional football for Rot-Weiß Oberhausen.

References

External links 
 

1983 births
Living people
Footballers from Essen
German footballers
Rot-Weiß Oberhausen players
Wuppertaler SV players
2. Bundesliga players
3. Liga players
German esports players
SK Gaming players
Association football defenders